Sjögren is a Swedish surname. Notable people with the surname include:

Anders Johan Sjögren (1794–1855), Finnish linguist, historian, ethnographer and explorer
Ann Mari Sjögren,  Swedish fantasy artist and illustrator 
Christer Sjögren, Swedish dansband and rock singer
Emil Sjögren (1853–1918), Swedish composer 
Gunnar A. Sjögren (1920-1996), Swedish engineer who worked for Saab 
Henrik Sjögren  (1899–1986), Swedish ophthalmologist for whom Sjögren's syndrome was named, an autoimmune disorder leading to dry eyes and mouth
Hjalmar Sjögren, Swedish geologist and mineralogist
John C. Sjogren, United States Army soldier who received the Medal of Honor in World War II
John M. Sjogren American film director 
Karin Sjögren (born 1960), Swedish curler, World and European champion
Katrin Sjögren (born 1966), Finnish politician from the Åland Islands
Peder Sjögren  (1905–1966), Swedish writer who fought in the Spanish Civil War
Peter Sjögren, Swedish floorball player (goalkeeper) 
Thomas Sjögren, retired Swedish professional ice hockey player
Torsten Sjögren, Swedish physician for whom Sjögren-Larsson syndrome was named, a form of ichthyosis

See also
Sjögren shotgun, 12 gauge semi-automatic shotgun of Norwegian origin 
Sjögren syndrome antigen B, a human protein which has been shown to interact with Nucleolin References 
Sjögren's syndrome, an autoimmune diseases named after Swedish ophthalmologist Henrik Sjögren
Sjögren–Larsson syndrome, an autosomal recessive form of ichthyosis apparent at birth 
Marinesco–Sjögren syndrome, a syndrome consisting of cerebellar ataxia, mental retardation, congenital cataracts
Rabén & Sjögren, a book publishing company in Sweden

Swedish-language surnames